Rabbi Asher Arieli (born 1957) is the senior lecturer at Yeshivas Mir in Israel. He is globally renowned for his lectures on Talmud and is widely recognized as a Gadol in his own right. He presently delivers the largest Talmudic lecture by attendance in the world with 1000 daily attendees. His primary, daily shiur begins at about 6:00pm and is streamed live at Kol Haloshon

Family life
Rabbi Asher Arieli is married to Rebbetzin Malka, the daughter of Hagaon Rabbi Nachum Partzovitz, the late Rosh Yeshiva of Mir. Rabbi Arieli is the son of Rabbi Chaim Yaakov Arieli, author of Be'er Yaakov (באר יעקב). Rabbi Chaim Yaakov Arieli was the son of Rabbi Yitzhak Arieli, author of Einaim L'Mishpat (עינים  למשפט) and Mashgiach Ruchani of Mercaz HaRav. Rabbi Mordechai Ilan, the son-in-law of Rabbi Yitzhak Arieli is Reb Asher's paternal uncle. Reb Chaim Yaakov's wife is the sister of Rabbi Moishe Sternbuch, as are the wives of Rabbi Meshulam Dovid Soloveitchik and Dayan Chanoch Ehrentreu  making the three Rabbis his uncles. Reb Asher's brother Rabbi Shlomo Arieli is the author of a critical edition of the novellae of Rabbi Akiva Eiger.

Before his marriage, Rabbi Arieli studied in the Ponevezh Yeshiva headed by Rabbi Shmuel Rozovsky, and he later studied under his father-in-law in the Mirrer Yeshiva.

Rabbi Arieli lives in the Sanhedria Murhevet neighborhood of Jerusalem, Israel where he has also been active in a movement to establish Rabbinic overseeing of the rent control there after an inadequate supply of rental units caused prices to rise substantially in a very short time period.

Lectures

The following is a partial list of Reb Asher's set lecture:
 Shiur is his daily lecture on the Talmudic Tractate officially learned in Mir (Yiddish).
 Monday and Thursday Chaburos are twice-weekly lectures on the Talmudic Tractate officially learned in Mir (Hebrew)
 Thursday night Chabura is an exclusive lecture expounding on the shiur delivered in Reb Asher's home to a select group of senior students.
 Tuesday night and Friday morning shiur (on talmudic tractate) given in Tifferet Tzvi, yeshiva haredit for Religious Zionist students.

Additionally, Reb Asher has delivered guest lectures for such events as the Agudas Yisroel annual Yarchei Kallah. The last eight years of Rabbi Arieli's lectures are available by telephone and for download.

Although Reb Asher's lectures are in Yiddish, his mother tongue is Hebrew and he only learnt Yiddish in order to understand the lectures which he heard in Yeshivas Mir. Lectures in the Mir are often given in Yiddish.

Students
Several of Reb Asher's students, such as Rav Yoel Rabin, Rav Yehudah Wagshal, Rav Shmuli Wolman, Rav Yaakov Moshe Katz, Rav Binyomin Cohen, Rav Elimelech Reznick, R' Moshe Ahron Friedman, Rav Yosef Elefant and Rav Shamai Bernstein give lectures in Yeshivas Mir for English-speaking audiences, mainly in the Beis Yeshaya building of Mir. Rav Eitan Yaffan is another distinguished talmid of Reb Asher. Rabbi Yechiel Spero, author of "Touched by a Story" considers himself a student of Reb Asher.

Many of his students are now respected lecturers in yeshivas worldwide, including the USA and the UK.

Sources

External links

Rabbi Yitzchok Ezrachi dancing with Rabbi Asher Arieli
Rabbi Arieli's eulogy for his father-in-law Rabbi Nochum Partzovitz

Living people
Haredi rabbis in Israel
Ponevezh Yeshiva alumni
1957 births
Yiddish-speaking people
People from Bnei Brak
Mir rosh yeshivas